James George Bell (December 14, 1831 – November 23, 1911) was an American settler and businessman who is considered a founder of the city of Bell, California.

Biography
Bell was born in Bowling Green, Kentucky, and later moved to Missouri. His friend J. Edward Hollenbeck persuaded Bell to join him in California.  James Bell arrived in San Francisco, California, in 1875, then traveled down the coast to Los Angeles.

The area was originally part of the Spanish land grant Rancho San Antonio. Between 1870 and 1890, the grant was broken into smaller land holdings and acquired by newly arriving settlers.

Bell engaged in cattle raising and dry farming, developed water wells, and rented land to vegetable farmers. The Bell family initially lived at the Hollenbeck's "Town House" at Fourth and Breed streets in what is now Boyle Heights until moving to a "ranch" in 1876. The family's "Bell House" was built in an early Victorian architectural style. Bell helped the area develop into a small farming and cattle raising community. Originally known as Obed, the California town's name was changed in 1898 to Bell to honor the pioneer founder.

He served as Bell's first postmaster and rose through the ritual ranks of the Masonic Lodge. Late in life, Bell would subdivide his land into tracts of  farms and move to Santa Fe Springs to live with his son Alphonzo, Sr. He was one of the founders of Occidental College.

Family life
Bell married Dorothea ("Dolly") A. Reasons on July 17, 1856 in Missouri and they had children George, Mary, and Otis F. Bell, Sr.  Dolly Bell died on November 27, 1864.  In June 1866, Bell married Susan Abia Hollenbeck, a sister of his friend J. Edward Hollenbeck. James Bell had left his family in Missouri when he headed west in 1875.  Six-months pregnant, Susan Bell and her four-year-old daughter Maude got on a box car to catch up with James in California.  The fifth child, Alphonzo, Sr., was born in 1875.

James George Bell's son, Alphonzo Bell, Sr., was an oil millionaire, real estate developer and champion tennis player. He established the Bell Petroleum Oil Company, and used oil revenues to develop Bel-Air Estates.  His grandson, Alphonzo E. Bell, Jr. was a popular 20th Century California Congressman.  The Bell family also gave their name to Bell Gardens.

Legacy

 Bell, California, and Bell Gardens, California, are named for him.

References

Further reading
 Guinn, J.M., "A History of California and an Extended History of Los Angeles and Environs", in 3 volumes, Los Angeles: Historical Record Co., 1915.

Businesspeople from Los Angeles
American city founders
University and college founders
1831 births
1911 deaths
Bell, California
Bell Gardens, California
People from Bell, California
People from Bowling Green, Kentucky
19th century in Los Angeles

19th-century American businesspeople